Eulepidotis argentilinea is a moth of the family Erebidae first described by William Schaus in 1906. It is found in the Neotropical realm, including the Brazilian state of Rio de Janeiro.

References

Moths described in 1906
argentilinea